Kyoko Kinoshita (木下亨子, Kinoshita Kyōko, born 12 January 1963) is a Japanese sport shooter who competed in the 1988 Summer Olympics.

References

1963 births
Living people
Japanese female sport shooters
ISSF rifle shooters
Olympic shooters of Japan
Shooters at the 1988 Summer Olympics
Shooters at the 1986 Asian Games
Asian Games medalists in shooting
Asian Games silver medalists for Japan
Asian Games bronze medalists for Japan
Medalists at the 1986 Asian Games
20th-century Japanese women